Frederick Valentine (born 1880, date of death unknown) was an English professional footballer who played as an outside forward.

References

1880 births
Year of death missing
English footballers
Association football defenders
Burnley F.C. players
Accrington Stanley F.C. (1891) players
English Football League players
Earlestown F.C. players